Bjarne Rosén (16 September 1909 – 6 November 1989) was a Norwegian footballer. He played in five matches for the Norway national football team from 1931 to 1934.

References

External links
 

1909 births
1989 deaths
Norwegian footballers
Norway international footballers
Place of birth missing
Association footballers not categorized by position